Gazette is an unincorporated community in southwest Pike County, in the U.S. state of Missouri. The community is located approximately 6.5 miles west of New Hartford. The Pike-Audrain county line is 1.3 miles to the west along Missouri Route K.

History
A post office called Gazette was established in 1887, and remained in operation until 1932. It is unknown why the name "Gazette" was applied to this community.

References

Unincorporated communities in Pike County, Missouri
Unincorporated communities in Missouri